Karan Singh II (7 January 1584 – March 1628) was the Maharana of Mewar Kingdom (r. 1620 – 1628). He was one of the sons of Maharana Amar Singh I and the grandson of Maharana Pratap. He, in turn, was succeeded by his son Jagat Singh I.. He succeeded his father on 26 Jan 1620 at the age of 36.

He made several reforms after coming to the throne. Also, palaces were enlarged and defenses strengthened. He presided in relatively peaceful times and Mewar prospered under his rule. He also renovated the Ranakpur Jain temple in 1621.

A lot of construction activities are known to have taken place during Rana Karan Singh's reign. He constructed water ditches that ran all along the walls of the Lake Pichola. These ditches received stormwater and overflow from Lake Pichola and conveyed it to Lake Udai Sagar from where the water was used for irrigation. Among the constructions in Udaipur city, he built the Gol Mahal and dome at Jagmandir Island Palace, along with a tank in Krishna Niwas.

References 

Mewar dynasty
1584 births
1628 deaths